Tina Malti is a Canadian-German child psychologist of Palestinian descent. She is a professor of psychology at the University of Toronto and founding director of the Laboratory for Social-Emotional Development and Intervention, as well as founding director of the Centre for Child Development, Mental Health, and Policy at the University of Toronto.

Tina is the current president of the International Society for the Study of Behavioural Development (ISSBD).

She is known for her research on the affective bases of aggression and prosocial behavior in children, as well as the development and testing of socio-emotional interventions for enhancing kindness and mental health and reducing the negative effects of exposure to violence and trauma in children facing varying levels of adversity.

Education 
Tina Malti earned a Ph.D. in developmental psychology from the Max Planck Institute for Human Development and Free University of Berlin, under the supervision of Wolfgang Edelstein . She also obtained a postgraduate M.A. in clinical child psychology from the Academy of Cognitive Behaviour Therapy for Children and Adolescents in Switzerland and a Habilitation in psychology from Free University of Berlin.

Research

Research expertise 
Tina’s research focuses on social-emotional development and mental health in children experiencing varying levels of adversity. Based on this work and a humanistic approach to child development, she creates and tests interventions that help children cultivate kindness and overcome the negative effects of exposure to violence, war, and trauma. To achieve these goals, Tina conducts and directs multidisciplinary research, training, and policy efforts that capitalize on inclusive principles and technological innovations to reach every child.

Tina is a co-editor of the Handbook of Child and Adolescent Aggression and the Cambridge Handbook of Prosociality. Her research has been profiled in The New York Times, The Atlantic, as well as other media outlets.

She and her team work closely with local and international communities and agencies to provide research-informed knowledge that can help nurture the development, wellbeing, and potential for kindness in children from all walks of life. Her work has been funded by all three federal funding agencies in Canada, the Public Health Agency of Canada, as well as international foundations and funding agencies. Her multi-cultural team has published over 200 publications in the areas of child development, mental health, and intervention research.

Leadership 
In 2019, Tina created and established the Centre for Child Development, Mental Health, and Policy at the University of Toronto Mississauga, and she became its founding director. The vision of this multi-disciplinary research centre is to foster every child’s healthy development and potential for kindness, both locally and globally. She has been named recipient of Germany’s most valuable research award, the Alexander von Humboldt Professorship.

Honors 
 Alexander von Humboldt Professorship, Alexander von Humboldt Foundation, 2023 
 Desmond Morton Research Excellence Award, University of Toronto Mississauga, 2019
 Fellow, American Psychological Association (Division 53, Clinical Child and Adolescent Psychology), 2019–present
 Fellow, American Psychological Association (Division 7, Developmental Psychology), 2015–present
 Fellow, Association for Psychological Science, 2015–present
 Dean’s Excellence Award, University of Toronto Mississauga, 2011, 2012, 2014, 2015, 2017, 2018
 Early Researcher Award, Ontario Ministry of Research and Innovation, 2012-2017
 New Investigator Award, Canadian Institutes of Health Research, 2012-2017
 Connaught Award for New Researchers, University of Toronto, 2011 
 Young Investigator Award, Society for Research on Adolescence, 2010
 Fellowship Award for Advanced Research Scientists, Swiss National Science Foundation, 2007-2010
 New Investigator Award, International Society for Research on Aggression, 2004

Publications
Colasante, T., Jambon, M., Gao, X., & Malti, T. (2020). A process model linking physiological arousal and fear recognition to aggression via guilt in middle childhood. Development and Psychopathology. Early online publication, February 27, 2020. 

Dys, S.P., Peplak, J., Colasante, T., & Malti, T. (2019). Children’s sympathy and sensitivity to excluding economically disadvantaged peers. Developmental Psychology, 55(3), 482–487. 

Malti, T. (2020). Children and violence: Nurturing social-emotional development to promote mental health. Social Policy Report (SPR), Society for Research in Child Development (SRCD), 33(2), 1-27. 

Malti, T. (2020). Kindness: A perspective from developmental psychology. European Journal of Developmental Psychology. Early online publication, October 12, 2020. 

Malti, T. (2016). Toward an integrated clinical-developmental model of guilt. Developmental Review, 39, 16–36. 

Malti, T., & Averdijk, M. (2017). Severe youth violence: Developmental perspectives. Introduction to the special section. Child Development, 88, 5–15. 

Malti, T., Chaparro, M. P., Zuffianò, A., & Colasante, T. (2016). School-based interventions to promote empathy-related responding in children and adolescents: A developmental analysis. Journal of Clinical Child and Adolescent Psychology, 45(6), 718–731. 

Malti, T., & Cheah, C.S.L. (Eds.) (forthcoming, 2021). Specificity and commonality: Sociocultural generalizability in social-emotional development. Special section. Child Development.

Malti, T., & Rubin, K. H. (Eds.) (2018). Handbook of child and adolescent aggression. New York: Guilford Press.

Zuffianò, A., Colasante, T., Buchmann, M., & Malti, T. (2018). The co-development of sympathy and overt aggression from childhood to early adolescence. Developmental Psychology, 54(1), 98-110.

References

External links 
 Tina Malti’s Laboratory for Social-Emotional Development and Intervention at the University of Toronto
 Centre for Child Development, Mental Health, and Policy at the University of Toronto Mississauga
 Tina Malti's Google Scholar page with the full list of her publications

Academic staff of the University of Toronto
Canadian psychologists
Developmental psychologists
Clinical psychologists
Living people
Year of birth missing (living people)